"Let's Shut Up & Dance" is a song by American singer Jason Derulo, Chinese singer-songwriter Lay and South Korean boy group NCT 127. It was released as a single on February 22, 2019, by 7SIX9 Entertainment.

Background
In an interview with Billboard, Derulo said, "I was so excited about this collaboration, We come from totally different worlds, but I really, really love their talent."

Music video
A music video to accompany the release of "Let's Shut Up & Dance" was first released onto YouTube on February 21, 2019.

Charts

Release history

Notes

References

2019 songs
2019 singles
Jason Derulo songs
Macaronic songs
NCT 127 songs
Songs about dancing
Songs about Michael Jackson
Lay Zhang songs